Invincible Spirit (foaled 17 February 1997) is an Irish-bred, British-trained Thoroughbred racehorse. After winning two of his four races as a two-year-old, he only raced twice as a three-year-old, losing on both occasions. In 2001 he won twice, including his first Group race win in the MacDonagh Boland Stakes. He won the Duke of York Stakes in 2002, and the Group 1 Haydock Sprint Cup at the end of that year. Since retiring from racing he has become one of Ireland's leading stallions, with his progeny including Fleeting Spirit, Kingman, Charm Spirit, Lawman, Mayson and Moonlight Cloud. Invincible Spirit was trained by John Dunlop and owned by Prince A. A. Faisal.

Background
Invincible Spirit is a bay horse bred by Nawara Stud and foaled on 17 February 1997. He was sired by Green Desert, a sprinter who won the July Cup and Haydock Sprint Cup in 1986. After retiring from racing he became a successful stallion, siring many top horses including Cape Cross, Desert Prince, Oasis Dream, Owington and Sheikh Albadou. Invincible Spirit's dam was Rafha, a daughter of Kris. Rafha, who was also owned by Prince Faisal, won the Prix de Diane in 1990. Invincible Spirit was trained by John Dunlop.

Racing career

1999: Two-year-old season
Invincible Spirit made his racecourse debut on 11 July 1999 in a six-furlong maiden race at Haydock Park. After being slowly away at the start, he finished the race in third place behind winner Trouble Mountain. Seventeen days later he lined up for another maiden, this time at Goodwood. He started the race as the favourite, and after being positioned near the rear of the field in the early stages, he came through the pack to take the lead with one furlong still to run. He then pulled clear to win by one and a half lengths from Break The Code. On 30 August, Invincible  Spirit was one of ten horses to contest the Ripon Ripon Champion Two Years Old Trophy, a Listed race run over six furlongs. He started as the 5/6 favourite and was ridden by Mick Kinane. Five furlongs into the race, Invincible Spirit quickened to lead the race and pulled away to win by one and a half lengths from Khasayl, with Femme Fatale a further three and a half lengths back in third place. Invincible Spirit's last race as a two-year-old was the Group 1 Middle Park Stakes. Jockey Richard Quinn held him up, but could not get him to settle early in the race. Invincible Spirit did make some progress in the penultimate furlong, but finished last of the six runners, about four and three quarter lengths behind winner Primo Valentino.

2000: Three-year-old season
Invincible Spirit did not race as a three-year-old until 16 September 2000, in the Dubai Duty Free Cup at Newbury. He was ridden for the first time by Pat Eddery, and after being at the rear of the field he could not get a clear run through in the home straight, finishing in fourth place behind winner Warningford. His only other race that year was the Challenge Stakes, where he finished sixth of the nine runners behind winner Last Resort.

2001: Four-year-old season
Invincible Spirit started the 2001 season on 4 May, in the Leicestershire Stakes, where he could not reach the leaders and finished fourth behind Warningford. Invincible Spirit then dropped in class for a six-furlong Conditions race at Goodwood. After racing in the middle of the pack, he made progress two furlongs out, before taking the lead as the field entered the final furlong. He went on to win the race by three quarters of a length from Kier Park after being eased up by Pat Eddery in the last 50 yards. Invincible Spirit then went to Royal Ascot for the Cork and Orrery Stakes, where after challenging the leaders over one furlong out, he faded in the final furlong and finished in ninth place. Harmonic Way won the race, beating runner-up Three Points by one length. On 21 July, Invincible Spirit started as the 3/1 favourite for the Hackwood Stakes, where he faced seven opponents. Eddery held him up as usual, before closing on the leaders over two furlongs out and taking the lead with a furlong still to run. After taking the lead he drifted to the right, but kept on to win a one and a half lengths from Mugharreb, with Bouncing Bowdler a further length back in third place.

On 26 August, Invincible Spirit raced outside the United Kingdom for the first time, when he contested the Prix de Meautry. He took second place with 200 metres left to run, but could not catch the leader, Do The Honours, who won easily by three lengths. Hot Tin Roof finished in third place, one and a half lengths behind Invincible Spirit. Invincible Spirit's final race start as a four-year-old came in the MacDonagh Boland Stakes, which took place on 15 September. He raced near the fore of the field in the early stages and was fourth with over one furlong still to run. He took second place inside the final furlong, before just taking the lead on the line to win the race by a short-head from Toroca, with the front two three lengths clear of third placed Anna Elise.

2002: Five-year-old season
Invincible Spirit started his five-year-old season by finishing fourth in the Abernant Stakes, a race that was won by Reel Buddy. After being held up, Invincible Spirit could not get a clear run until the final furlong, when he ran on finishing two lengths behind the winner. In the Duke of York Stakes he was ridden for the first and only time by Mick Kinane. After starting as the 3/1 favourite, Kinane positioned him just behind the leaders in the early stages of the race. In a close finish, Invincible Spirit took the lead with about 75 yards left to run and won the race by a neck from Mugharreb, with Lady Dominatrix third and Orientor fourth. On 3 June he raced over the minimum distance of five furlongs for the only time in his career, when he took part in the Temple Stakes at Sandown Park. After tracking the leaders he was left behind when he could not get a clear run over one furlong out, before running on in the final furlong and finishing fifth, about four lengths behind winner Kyllachy.

At Royal Ascot, Invincible Spirit raced in the Golden Jubilee Stakes (the renamed Cork and Orrery Stakes, which had been upgraded to a Group 1 race that year). He started the race at the price of 10/1, with Johannesburg starting as the 3/1 favourite, and Three Points, Danehurst and Continent also near the fore of the betting market. Invincible Spirit was slowly away and jockey Kieren Fallon lost an iron. He was up near the leaders with two furlongs remaining, but faded to finish in sixth place, about five lengths behind the winner. The race was won by Malhub, who beat second-placed Danehurst by one and a half lengths. Invincible Spirit's final race was the Sprint Cup at Haydock Park, where he was ridden by John Carroll. Nayyir was the pre-race favourite at 9/2, with Invincible Spirit starting as a 25/1 outsider. Carroll positioned him near the front of the fourteen-runner field and was challenging for the lead as they entered the final furlong. He stayed on best in the closing stages and took the lead near the finishing line to win the race by a short-head from Malhub. Three Points finished in third place, two lengths behind the winner, and just ahead of Orientor and May Ball, who finished fourth and fifth respectively.

Stud career
 
Invincible Spirit Entered Stud in 2003 at the Irish National Stud and Shuttled to Australia 2004-07. He has been in the top 20 sires in Britain by prize money for every season since his first crop were three-year-olds in 2007, including being second in the leading sire list in 2014. In 2019 his son I Am Invincible became the highest priced stallion in Australia, at a stud fee of A$247,500.  Invincible Spirit has so far sired 45 Group race winners, including 11 at Group 1 level.

Notable progeny

Group/Grade 1 winners:

c = colt, f = filly

Pedigree

Note: b. = Bay, ch. = Chestnut

References

1997 racehorse births
Racehorses bred in Ireland
Racehorses trained in the United Kingdom
Thoroughbred family 7-a